Martin District (okres Martin) is a district in the Žilina Region of central Slovakia. Its main cultural, economic and administrative seat is the city of Martin. Martin District is one of the most important cultural centers in Slovakia. The city of Martin is the location and seat of the largest Slovak library, the Slovak National Museum, the cultural organisation Matica Slovenská and the Slovak Red Cross. In the district are 16 sport clubs, including ice hockey, football and handball, which all have their separate sport halls. Martin District economy is based foremost on the engineering industry, but also on the wood processing, construction, paper and cellulose industries.

Municipalities

References 

 
Districts of Slovakia